Bad Steben is a market town in the district of Hof in Bavaria in Germany. In 2007, Bad Steben celebrated its 175th anniversary as a Bavarian State Spa.

References

Hof (district)
Spa towns in Germany